Miloš Stojanović (born 18 January 1997) is a Serbian professional footballer who plays as a defender for Bylis Ballsh.

Club career

Red Star Belgrade

First team highlights
Stojanović joined the first team of Red Star Belgrade, under coach Ricardo Sá Pinto for the final match of 2012–13 Serbian SuperLiga season Vojvodina. During the summer 2013, Stojanović passed the pre-season with the first team, but later returned in youth squad, where he spent the whole 2013–14 season. He was also with the first team at the beginning of 2014–15 season, but continued playing with youth until the end of season. He was one of 4 players on the bench in the last fixture of the 2014–15 Serbian SuperLiga season against Mladost Lučani, when he also made an official debut for the first team under coach Nenad Lalatović. On 18 February 2016, Stojanović extended his contract with Red Star Belgrade, until the summer 2019, and made noted 3 caps until the end of 2015–16 season. In January 2018, Red Star and Stojanović mutually terminated the contract, after which he left the club.

Loan spells
During the spring half of 2014–15 season, Stojanović was loaned to Serbian First League side Kolubara, where he spent some period on dual registration, making 6 appearances mostly as a side-back. In summer 2015, Stojanović moved to Bežanija at dual registration, along with goalkeeper Filip Manojlović. During the first half season he missed some period because od injury, and he played just 5 league matches. After signing a new contract with his home club, Stojanović stayed with Bežanija until the end of season. Although he spent summer training with OFK Beograd, Stojanović continued playing with Bežanija for the 2016–17 season. After Nemanja Matović left Bežanija at the beginning of 2017, Stojanović started second half-season as a vice-captain, behind Filip Osman. In summer 2017, Stojanović joined Sinđelić Beograd at one-year loan deal. In the mid-season, a loan deal was terminated and Stojanović returned to Red Star Belgrade.

Voždovac
On 23 January 2018, Stojanović joined Voždovac as a single player, signing two-and-a-half year deal with new club.

Career statistics

Club

Honours
Red Star Belgrade
Serbian SuperLiga: 2013–14, 2015–16

References

External links
 Miloš Stojanović stats at utakmica.rs 
 
 
 
 

1997 births
Living people
Footballers from Belgrade
Association football defenders
Serbian footballers
Serbian expatriate footballers
Serbia youth international footballers
Red Star Belgrade footballers
FK Kolubara players
FK Bežanija players
FK Sinđelić Beograd players
FK Voždovac players
FK Budućnost Dobanovci players
FK Sloboda Tuzla players
KF Bylis players
Serbian First League players
Serbian SuperLiga players
Premier League of Bosnia and Herzegovina players
Kategoria Superiore players
Serbian expatriate sportspeople in Bosnia and Herzegovina
Serbian expatriate sportspeople in Albania
Expatriate footballers in Bosnia and Herzegovina
Expatriate footballers in Albania